Lê Trung Trung (born c. 1928) is a former Vietnamese cyclist. He competed in the individual and team road race events at the 1956 Summer Olympics.

References

External links
 

1920s births
Possibly living people
Vietnamese male cyclists
Olympic cyclists of Vietnam
Cyclists at the 1956 Summer Olympics
Place of birth missing (living people)